Kettleshulme is a civil parish in Cheshire East, England. It contains 18 buildings that are recorded in the National Heritage List for England as designated listed buildings. Of these, one is listed at Grade II*, the middle grade, and the others are at Grade II. Apart from the village of Kettleshulme, the parish is rural. Most of the listed buildings are houses, cottages, farmhouses, and farm cottages. The others are a former public house, a former mill, two bridges and a milestone.

Key

Buildings

See also

 Listed buildings in Lyme Handley
 Listed buildings in Rainow

References
Citations

Sources

 

Listed buildings in the Borough of Cheshire East
Lists of listed buildings in Cheshire